The 2019 Banja Luka Challenger was a professional tennis tournament played on clay courts. It was the eighteenth edition of the tournament which was part of the 2019 ATP Challenger Tour. It took place in Banja Luka, Bosnia and Herzegovina from 9 to 15 September 2019.

Singles main-draw entrants

Seeds

 1 Rankings are as of 26 August 2019.

Other entrants
The following players received wildcards into the singles main draw:
  Filip Krolo
  Nemanja Malešević
  Nikola Milojević
  Matija Pecotić
  Goran Radanović

The following player received entry into the singles main draw as an alternate:
  Jaume Pla Malfeito

The following players received entry from the qualifying draw:
  Fabien Reboul
  Matej Sabanov

Champions

Singles

 Tallon Griekspoor def.  Sumit Nagal 6–2, 6–3.

Doubles

 Sadio Doumbia /  Fabien Reboul def.  Sergio Galdós /  Facundo Mena 6–3, 7–6(7–4).

References

2019 in Bosnia and Herzegovina sport
2019 ATP Challenger Tour
2019
September 2019 sports events in Europe